"Frail" is a song by Canadian electronic music band, Crystal Castles. It is the first single of the band's 2016 album, Amnesty (I). On April 17, 2015, it was made available for free download on the duo's SoundCloud page.

History
On April 17, 2015, Ethan Kath shared a new track titled "Frail" on soundcloud, writing 'this is Edith on vocals'. The track was released digitally on iTunes a month later on May 11.

Personnel
 Ethan Kath – production, mixing
 Edith Frances – vocals
 Alex Zelenka – engineer
 Samuel Jacob – engineer
 Patrick Mundy – mix
 Brian Gardner – master
 Au Vyst – artwork

References

External links
 

2015 singles
2015 songs
Crystal Castles (band) songs
Polydor Records singles
Fiction Records singles
Songs written by Ethan Kath